KJST may refer to:

 KJST-LD, a low-power television station (channel 11, virtual 28) licensed to McAllen, Texas, United States
 the ICAO code for Johnstown-Cambria County Airport